Talat Aziz (born 11 November 1956) is a popular ghazal singer from Hyderabad, India.

Early life
Aziz was born in Hyderabad, India to Abdul Azeem Khan and Sajida Abid, a famous Urdu writer and poet. He attended Hyderabad Public School, Begumpet and then joined the Indian Institute of Management and Commerce for his B.Com. (Hons) Course.

His family loved fine arts and used to organise Mehfils in their house, inviting artists and poets like Jagjit Singh and Jan Nisar Akhtar. This greatly influenced him and he started learning music from an early age.

Personal life

Aziz is married to Bina Aziz, a famous painter and art curator. They have two sons, Adnan Aziz and Shayaan Aziz.

Career

Musical career
Talat Aziz took his initial training in music from Kirana Gharana. He was trained primarily by Ustad Samad Khan and later by Ustad Faiyyaz Ahmed Khan.

After the initial training, Aziz learnt music from the Ghazal maestro Mehdi Hassan. On many occasions, like on a concert tour of the US and Canada in 1986, he shared the stage with him on concerts in India and abroad. 

He released his first album in Feb 1980, under the baton of Jagjit Singh. Jagjit Singh composed this album titled Jagjit Singh presents Talat Aziz. This was a runaway hit Subsequently, in 1981 Khayyam Saheb, music director introduced Talat Aziz in the classic film Umrao Jaan with the famous ghazal Zindagi Jab Bhi and followed it by Bazaar, with Phir Chidi Raat which he sang along with Lata Mangeshkar.

Films
He has also sung film songs composed by Laxmikant–Pyarelal in the film Dhun (where he also acted as a main lead and sang a bhajan along with Mehdi Hasan) and with Rajesh Roshan in the film Daddy for Aaina Mujhse Meri.

TV serials
Talat has also composed music for TV serials and has also acted in several of them. He composed music for tele-serials like Deewar (TV series), Baaz, Adhikaar, Ghutan (TV series), Sailaab (TV series), Aashirwad (TV series) and the magnum opus, Noorjahan (TV series). He also composed the music and sang too for a feature film titled  Majaz: Ae Gham-e-Dil Kya Karun recently in 2016. This film was produced by Shakeel Akhtar and was a biography of the iconic poet Majaz.

Acting
As an actor he has acted in serials like Sahil, Manzil, Dil Apna Aur Preet Parayee and Noorjehan a TV serial written by Nida Fazli. He also acted as the main lead in the film 'Dhun' directed by Mahesh Bhatt where his co stars were Anupam Kher and Sangeeta Bijlani with the music by Laxmikant Pyarelal and lyrics by Anand Bakshi. The music album was released by HMV in 1991. Songs like Yaad Aane Wale, Laagi Prem dhun laagi, Main Aatma are still remembered by music lovers. One interesting fact is that Mehdi Hasan sang a bhajan along with Talat "Main aatma tu Parmaatma" for the first time in an Indian film.

Recently Aziz acted in the feature film Fitoor produced and released by Disney in 2015 where he had a cameo. This film, directed by Abhishek Kapoor, had Aditya Roy Kapur, Katrina Kaif, Tabu, and Rahul Bhat in key roles.

Talat released many albums like Talat Aziz live, Images A team Come True, Lehren, Ehsaas, Suroor, Saughaat, Tasavvur (the first video album of ghazals in 1987), Manzil, Storms, Dhadkan, Shahkaar, Mehboob, Khubsoorat, Irshaad, Khushnuma, Caravan e Ghazal in which Sonu Nigam also participated in a duet Qurbaton Mein Bhi a ghazal written by Ahmad Faraz. He also recorded an album A Tribute to his Master which was recorded in Los Angeles as a tribute to his guru Mehdi Hasan and the tabla accompaniment for this album by Ustad Tari Khan. This album got a nomination in the best ghazal album category in the prestigious GIMA (Global Indian Music Awards).

The singer was the first ghazal artiste to release a ghazal music video of Tasavvur, in 1987 when a video album was not even thought of. He is often seen on the small screen in various roles as a music judge.

Talat Aziz has been singing in concerts for over four decades and has travelled the globe with his sell out performances. On 31 December 1999 he was invited by the Prime Minister of India Shri Atal Bihari Vajpayee to perform specially for him and his close family at the Taj Garden Retreat Kumarakom, Kerala. He sang a special number written by Janab Nida Fazli for the occasion titled Vrindavan ke Krishan kanhaiya Allah hu which was deeply appreciated by everyone specially the PM.

In 2003 he was invited by the King of Morocco Mohd XI to Marrakech as his special guest to celebrate the New Year along with a host of celebrities from around the world including Sir Sean Connery.

In 2007 he was invited by Shri L.K. Advani the deputy PM at that time to sing in Delhi. He sang the famous song from the film 'Daddy' which is Shri L.K. Advani's favourite.

He celebrated his 25 Years Anniversary with the launch of a special audio and video album at the NCPA  Tata auditorium Mumbai where the veritable who's who of the music industry were present and a special documentary on his life was screened.

He also curated a Bollywood Electro Music Festival titled Bollyboom for Percept India which was held all over India and the World from November 2013.

In November 2013 he started hosting a special radio show titled Carvaan e Ghazal as an RJ on 92.7 Big FM which was relayed every Sunday 9 pm to 11 pm nationally in 45 cities all over India. This radio program was about ghazals, ghazal singers, ghazal lovers ghazals in films and was in the top 3 programs on the channel. It was a weekly and received an amazing response. It also won the most prestigious Radio Award called the IRF India Radio Forum Awards for the best Hindi non breakfast radio show on 31 May 2014. He had stalwarts like Ghulam Ali, Gulzar, Nida Fazli, Sonu Nigam, Asha Bhosle, Chitra Singh and his friends like Pankaj Udhas, Anup Jalota, Hariharan amongst a host of celebrities who came to the show. This show got over in October 2015.

In fact the great doyen Dilip Kumar Saheb was so impressed by this show that Saira Bano ji invited Talat and his wife Bina to their home as Dilip Kumar Saheb a fan of Talat wanted to congratulate him in person.

In the month of August and September of 2015, he toured the U.S. for a special show titled 'The Iconic Tour' conceived by Bina Aziz in conjunction with Prria Haider Productions in USA who executed it for six packed concerts all over the U.S. where for the first time he sang Bollywood retro songs with Asha Bhosle. The highlight of this tour was that all the concerts were held at very prestigious venues like the Fox Theatre in Atlanta, the Grand Sears Arena in Chicago, the Allen Center in Dallas, the Arena Theatre in Houston and with a grand Finale at the New Jersey Performing Arts Center NJPAC and they were sold out completely and set a standard of excellence. For the first time high end graphics were special designed under the supervision of Bina Aziz with VJ Tarang which were programmed for each track individually adding to the great ambience and this was highly appreciated by the audience.

In February 2016 he released a ghazal single titled 'Wo Shaam' the first digital ghazal audio and video release and it reached more than 600,000 people in a time frame of two weeks through the social Media like Facebook.

He also recorded two tracks with young upcoming artists like Piyush Shankar, Teesha Nigam for the new year 2017 titled "Meri Dua- A prayer" and another song with another talented upcoming singer Siddharth Slathia for Valentine's Day 2017. These songs were written composed and sung by him in collaboration with youngsters . Released worldwide on Facebook of all music lovers.

He toured the US in September/October of 2017 titled 'Dil Se', performing in nine cities.

Discography
Talat has released many albums. He is equally versatile while singing a popular Sufi number like "Damadam mast Kalandar" or the soul stirring rendition of "Aaina Mujhse Meri" from the film Daddy. Between 1979 and 1984 he was the top artist recording for Music India Company. In 1984, he joined HMV, now Saregama Music the giant recording company. He also worked with Venus Records for a brief period when he released a number of hit albums

Some of his famous albums are:

 Jagjit Singh presents Talat Aziz
 Talat Aziz live ( Double album)
 Best of Talat Aziz 
 Images( Double Album)
 A team Come True
 Lehren
 Ehsaas
 Suroor
 Saughaat (Double Album)
 Tasavvur (Double Album)
 Manzil (Double Album)
 Storms
 Dhadkan (Double CD Pack)
 Shahkaar
 Mehboob
 Talat Aziz sings Qateel Shifai
 Irshaad (Double CD pack)
 Khubsoorat
 Khushnuma
 Silver Anniversary Concert (Two CD pack)
 Silver Anniversary Concert (DVD Pack)
 Caravan-E-Ghazal
 A Tribute to the Master Mehdi Hasan
 Parchaaiyan vol 1
 Parchaaiyan vol 2
 Hardil Aziz
 Betaabiyaan
 Jazbaat
 The Ghazal Maestro
 Wo Shaam

Popular film songs

Television

As actor

Sailaab
Sahil
 Junoon
Ghutan (1997-1998)
Dil Apna Aur Preet Parayee
Noorjahan (2000-2001)
Modern Love: Mumbai Episode 2 - Baai (2022)
 Gulmohar (2023) movie on Hotstar

As contestant
Jhalak Dikhhla Jaa 5 (2012), Eliminated 1st on 30 June 2012

References

External links

 
 
 
 Interview of Talat Aziz from The Hindu

1956 births
Living people
Indian male ghazal singers
Singers from Hyderabad, India